The Shire of Nillumbik is a local government area in Victoria, Australia. It contains outer northern suburbs of Melbourne and rural localities beyond the urban area. It has an area of 432 square kilometres and at the 2021 census, the Shire had a population of 62,895.  It was formed in 1994  from the merger of parts of the Shires of Eltham, Diamond Valley, Healesville and the City of Whittlesea. The Shire uses the tag-line The Green Wedge Shire. The Nillumbik Council offices are located in Civic Drive, Greensborough.

The shire's name is derived from the Parish of Nillumbik, which was named in the 1830s the term nyilum bik meaning "Bad Earth" in the local Aboriginal language Woiwurrung.

On 13 October 1998, Nillumbik Council was suspended by then Local Government minister Rob Maclellan, with the state government declaring that infighting was affecting the ability of the council to function.

Nillumbik was rated third of 590 Australian local government areas in the BankWest Quality of Life Index 2008.

Council

The current council was elected in October 2020 for a four-year term.

Townships and localities
The 2021 census, the shire had a population of 62,895 up from 61,273 in the 2016 census

^ - Territory divided with another LGA

Facilities
Nillumbik's oldest public building is the Eltham courthouse which was restored in 2022.

Eltham Library and Diamond Valley Library located in Greensborough are operated by Yarra Plenty Regional Library  A mobile library service is also operated by Yarra Plenty Regional Library serving the locations of Doreen, Panton Hill, St Andrews, Hurstbridge, North Warrandye, Kangaroo Ground, Diamond Creek and Christmas Hills.

Nillumbikk U3A provides a wide range of courses open to all retired and semi-retired people

NillumBUG is a bicycle user group for the Nillumbik Shire.

Books on the Shire of Nillumbik 
Marshall, Marguerite, Nillumbik Now and Then Research, Vic. MPrint Publications, 2008

See also

 Shire of Eltham

References

External links
 
Official website
Public Transport Victoria local public transport map 
Link to Land Victoria interactive maps
Yarra Plenty Regional Library
Eltham District Historical Society
Local Community Wiki
Living and Learning in Nillumbik
Community Organisations in Nillumbik and Environs
Nillumbik Heritage Guide

Local government areas of Melbourne
Greater Melbourne (region)